The Supreme Military Command of the Interior and Islands (Anóteri Stratiotikí Deíkisi Esoterikoú ke Níson, ASDEN), more commonly known as ASDEN, is a Corps-sized formation of the Hellenic Army responsible for the defence of the Aegean Islands.

History
Formed in Athens in 1945 as the Higher Military Command of Attica (Anotéra Stratiotikí Deíkisi Attikís, ASDA), by 1961 it had evolved from a territorial defence force to a Corps-sized formation, overseeing the Aegean region's four National Guard Commands. It was soon renamed to the Supreme Military Command of the Interior and Islands (Anotati Stratiotikí Deíkisi Esoterikoú ke Níson, ASDEN) to reflect the expansion of its role.

In 1995, the command's headquarters were relocated to the suburb of Karea in Athens, Attica, and by 2005 it had become a major operational formation of the Hellenic Army, consisting of two division and five brigade-strength, mechanized, National Guard Battalion Higher Commands (Anóteri Deíkisi Tagmáton Ethnofylakís, ADTE). After a wide-ranging defense review in 2013, the Corps' capabilities were strengthened with the 5th Infantry Brigade reorganized as an air assault brigade to become ASDEN's rapid reaction force.

Emblem and Motto
The emblem of the ASDEN depicts the Lion Gate of Mycenae. It symbolizes power through unity.

The Corps' motto, Defending One's Country (Amýnesthae Perí Pátris), is from Homer's Iliad, attributed to the Trojan Prince Hector in the final days of the Trojan War, when Polydamas advised him to stop the attack on the Achaeans because the omens were not auspicious. Hector replied "There's one good omen, defending one's country!".

Structure

  Supreme Military Command of the Interior and Islands
 Corps HQ Battalion, based at Athens, Attica
 Corps Engineer Command (ΔΜΧ/ΑΣΔΕΝ), based at Athens, Attica
 2nd Signal, EW, Surveillance Regiment (2ο ΣΕΗΠΠΕΠ), based at Athens, Attica
 291st Recruits Training Center (291o KEN), based at Syros, Cyclades
   5th Airmobile Brigade (5 A/M ΤΑΞ "V Μεραρχία Κρητών"), based at Chania, Crete
   79th National Guard Higher Command (79 ΑΔΤΕ), based at Samos
  80th National Guard Higher Command (80 ΑΔΤΕ), based at Kos, Dodecanese
  88th Military Command (88 ΣΔΙ), based at Myrina, Lemnos
  95th National Guard Higher Command (95 ΑΔΤΕ), based at Rhodes, Dodecanese
    96th National Guard Higher Command (96 ΑΔΤΕ), based at Chios
 98th National Guard Higher Command (98 ΑΔΤΕ), based at Lesbos

References and links

Corps of Greece
1945 establishments in Greece